The 2015 Chicago Marathon was the 38th edition of the Chicago Marathon, held in Chicago, Illinois, on Sunday, October 11. The elite men's race was won by Kenyan Dickson Chumba in a time of 2:09:25 hours and the women's race was won by another Kenyan, Florence Kiplagat, in 2:23:33.

Results

Men

Women

Wheelchair men

Wheelchair women

References

Results
Chicago Marathon 2015 Leaderboard. Chicago Marathon. Retrieved on 2015-10-12.
Results. Association of Road Racing Statisticians. Retrieved 2020-04-07.

Chicago Marathon
2010s in Chicago
Chicago Marathon
Chicago Marathon
Chicago
Chicago Marathon
Chicago Marathon